John Adams (March 26, 1705 – January 22, 1740) was an American poet.

Biography
Adams was the only son of merchant Hon. John Adams and Hannah Checkley of Nova Scotia, and he graduated from Harvard University in 1721.  He joined the ministry of the Congregational Church at Newport, Rhode Island, on April 11, 1728, in opposition to the wishes of Mr. Clap, who was pastor there. Clap's friends formed a new society, and Adams was dismissed in about two years.

He was distinguished for his intellect and piety. As a preacher he was much esteemed. His uncle, Matthew Adams, described him as "master of nine languages," and claimed that he was conversant with the most famous Greek, Latin, Italian, French, and Spanish authors, as well as with the noblest English writers. He also speaks of his nephew's "great and undissembled piety, which ran, like a vein of gold, through all his life and performances."

Adams published a sermon on his ordination, 1728, and a poem on the love of money. He published two volumes of poetry: A Collection of Poems by Several Hands (1744), and Poems on Several Occasions (1745), which contains imitations and paraphrases of several portions of scripture, translations from  Horace, and the whole book of Revelation in heroic verse, together with original pieces. The versification is remarkably harmonious for the period and the country. The following is an extract from his poem on Cotton Mather:

He died at Cambridge, Massachusetts on January 22, 1740, at the age of 36, deeply lamented by his acquaintance.

References

1704 births
1740 deaths
18th-century American people
18th-century American poets
18th-century American male writers
American male poets
American Congregationalists
Congregationalist writers
Harvard University alumni
Writers from Boston
Writers from Cambridge, Massachusetts
Writers from Newport, Rhode Island